Suleiman Mohamoud Adan, also known as Saleebaan Gaal is a Somaliland politician  and the current speaker of Somaliland House of Elders.  Previously, he served as the Minister of Interior in Somaliland's first government under President Abdirahman Ahmed Ali Tuur.

Under President Muhammad Haji Ibrahim Egal's administration, he also served as Minister of Education and later as the  Minister of Finance.

See also

 Ministry of Finance (Somaliland)
 House of Elders (Somaliland)
 Politics of Somaliland
 Parliament of Somaliland

References

|-

Living people
Finance Ministers of Somaliland
Interior Ministers of Somaliland
Somaliland politicians
Year of birth missing (living people)
Speakers of the House of Elders (Somaliland)